Gabe Jones  is a retired American soccer player who was the 1995 USISL MVP and leading scorer.  He played one game for the Dallas Burn of Major League Soccer.

Youth
In 1991, Jones graduated from Georgetown High School.  He attended St. Edwards University where he was an NAIA All American soccer player.  He graduated in 1995 with a bachelor's degree in international studies.  In 2002, St. Edwards University inducted Jones into its Athletic Hall of Fame.

Professional
In 1995, Jones played for the Austin Lone Stars in the USISL.  He was the 1995 USISL MVP while leading the league in scoring.  He was the second leading scorer in the 1997 U.S. Open Cup.  That year, he also played one game for the Dallas Burn of Major League Soccer.  In 1998, Jones led the USISL D3 Pro League with assists and was named First Team All League.  On February 6, 1999, the Dallas Burn selected Jones in the second round (eighteenth overall) of the 1999 MLS Supplemental Draft.  The Burn released him on April 2, 1999.  He then returned to the Lone Stars for the remainder of the season.  In 2004, Jones played for the Austin Lightning.

References 

1973 births
Living people
American soccer players
Austin Lone Stars players
Austin Lightning players
FC Dallas players
Major League Soccer players
New Orleans Riverboat Gamblers players
USL League Two players
USL Second Division players
A-League (1995–2004) players
Soccer players from Texas
FC Dallas draft picks
People from Georgetown, Texas
Association football forwards
Association football midfielders